Rebeka Kárpáti; (born 9 October 1994) is a Hungarian beauty pageant titleholder who was crowned Miss Universe Hungary 2013 and represented her country at the Miss Universe 2013 pageant.

Early life
Rebeka is a student and working as model. Her parents are actors: her father, Péter R.Kárpáti is well known from the Hungarian soap opera Barátok közt. She has a younger brother, András.

A Szépségkirálynő 2013
A Szépségkirálynő 2013 was held at the TV2 studios in Budapest on 21 June 2013. Rebeka Kárpáti was crowned Miss Hungary 2013 (Miss Universe Hungary 2013) and competed at the Miss Universe 2013, in Moscow, Russia.

References

External links
Official Miss Universe Hungary website

1994 births
Living people
Hungarian beauty pageant winners
Miss Universe 2013 contestants